Pappilan neidot (Finnish: The Damsels of the Vicarage) is a historical novel by Finnish author Kaari Utrio.

1977 novels
Novels by Kaari Utrio
Tammi (company) books
20th-century Finnish novels
Finnish historical novels